The Canadian Home Rotors Safari is a kit helicopter, produced by CHR International of Marianna, Florida, and formerly produced by Safari Helicopter (formerly known as Canadian Home Rotors) of Ear Falls, Ontario.

The design is reminiscent of a small-scale Bell 47 helicopter. In fact, the helicopter was originally called the Baby Belle, but Bell Helicopters objected and the name was changed to Safari.

Design
The Safari is a two-seat light helicopter with a bubble canopy, a two-bladed main rotor and a skid landing gear. The aircraft structure consists predominantly of welded 4130 chromoly steel tubing. The kit provides the main and tail rotors, rotor hubs, transmission, engine, cockpit and tailboom completed. Builder construction is largely assembly.

Engine options over time have included the  Lycoming O-320-B2B,  Lycoming O-360-C2C, the  Superior XP320 and the  XP360 engines.

Specifications (Safari 400)

See also

References

External links

 

2000s Canadian helicopters